is a Japanese monthly fashion magazine published by Shogakukan. Its name supposedly derives from "I Can Campus", because girls who read it are expected to become "campus leaders". The magazine was created for fashion-conscious consumers, and offers information on fashion, makeup, bags, accessories, and related topics. The magazine is targeted as a  fashion resource to novice office ladies as well as university students. The magazine has its headquarters in Tokyo.

History
In 2005 the Chinese version of CanCam was started. In March 2007 Shogakukan launched the sister magazine, AneCan, which is targeted at women in their mid- to late twenties. Model Moe Oshikiri left CanCam to become a regular for the magazine. In August 2008, it was announced that another of the magazine's popular models, Yuri Ebihara, would be "graduating" from the magazine and moving on to AneCan. Ebihara's last appearance in CanCam was the December 2008 issue. Oshikiri and Ebihara were previously part of the well-known CanCam trio with Yu Yamada.

Exclusive models

Current
References
 Ikumi Hisamatsu
 Mizuki Yamamoto
 Ayami Nakajo
 Rikako Sakata
 Naomi Trauden
 Yuki Sawa
 Akane Hotta
 Mai
 Sayuri Matsumura (Nogizaka46)
 Mizuki Yamashita (Nogizaka46)
 Shiho Kato (Hinatazaka46)

Past

 Elaiza Ikeda
 Aiku Maikawa
 Anna Kay
 Asami Ueda
 Atsuko Watanabe
 Ayumi Sakai
 Erika Mine
 Eriko Fujimoto
 Fumiyo Kashima
 Harumi Abe
 Hikari Mori
 Hiromi Kitagawa
 Hitomi Sawano
 Itsuko Onuki
 Junko Izumi
 Junko Miyashita
 Keiko Kon-no
 Kyōko Hasegawa
 Kyoko Kogiso
 Leena
 Maeko Yamagami
 Maimi Okuwa
 Maki Nishiyama
 Mari Inubushi
 Mariko Fujii
 Mariko Takada
 Maryjun Takahashi
 Mew Azama
 Miharu Hirayama
 Miki Akabane
 Misaki Ito
 Miwa Sakai
 Moe Oshikiri
 Naoko Tokuzawa
 Norika Fujiwara
 Noriko Sugawara
 Risa Tanaka
 Ryoko Yonekura
 Sachiko Kokubun
 Satoko Koizumi
 Shizuka Kondo
 Takako Maeda
 Toshie Kubo
 Yoko Horiuchi
 You Fujii
 Yu Yamada
 Yui Nakata
 Yuka Nanjo
 Yumiko Fujii
 Yumiko Watanabe
 Yuri Ebihara
 Yumi Higashino
 Koharu Kusumi
 Ayano Wakayama
 Hazuki Tsuchiya
 Nanami Hashimoto

Gallery

References

External links
  
 "2011: 30 Years of CanCam"

1981 establishments in Japan
Fashion magazines published in Japan
Monthly magazines published in Japan
Women's magazines published in Japan
Magazines established in 1981
Magazines published in Tokyo
Shogakukan magazines
Women's fashion magazines